Zhang Zetong (born Teoh Ze Tong, 22 January 1993), is a Malaysian actor, singer and presenter based in Singapore.

Career
Zhang participated in Star Search 2019 of Mediacorp and won the championship. He was signed on by The Celebrity Agency (TCA) of Mediacorp after winning the contest. His debut work was All Around You as the lead actor.  Zhang won his first award, Best Newcomer Award at Star Awards 2021, for his role in the drama, A Jungle Survivor.

In 2019, Zhang participated in Mediacorp Star Search and chose Christopher Lee as mentor. He eventually won the contest as the 1st place winner and champion. 

In 2020, Zhang made his television debut in meWATCH online series drama All Around You by playing a male lead role namely Chen Shiyang and a supporting role namely Zhong Jianting in Mediacorp Channel 8 drama A Jungle Survivor.  He also partnered his former mentor, Christopher Lee to host a programme Aus-some Getaway. 

In 2021, Zhang also crossed over to play supporting role in Mediacorp Channel 5 drama Slow Dancing as Kaden Leung.  He  also later played supporting roles in Mediacorp Channel 8 dramas namely Key Witness as Nick Zhu Jingxiang and The Take Down as Lin Jincheng. He was nominated and went on to win the Best Newcomer Award for his work in A Jungle Survivor as Zhong Jianting in Star Awards 2021.

In 2022, he played the male lead role for second time as Mei Yishi in the fourth season of Mediacorp Channel 8 drama You Can Be An Angel namely You Can Be An Angel 4, replacing several actors who were more senior when they took on the male lead roles in three previous seasons and although he never took part in previous seasons. He also played the roles of Zhang Zhendong, Jason and Aden in meWATCH drama First of April directed by fellow artiste Zheng Geping. He was also nominated for the Best Supporting Actor Award for his work in Key Witness as Nick Zhu Jingxiang, Most Attention Seeking New-Gen Host Award for his work in JustSwipeLah as well as Bioskin Most Charismatic Artiste Award in Star Awards 2022. However, he was defeated in all three nominations. Later in the same year and in earlier 2023, he played the role of Zhong Haonan in his first long-form drama Healing Hands.

Filmography

TV Series

Shows

TV Series

Discography

Compilation Album

Honours and awards

References

External links

1993 births
Living people
Mediacorp
Singaporean male television actors
Singaporean male actors
Singaporean television personalities
Malaysian emigrants to Singapore
Malaysian people of Chinese descent
People from Johor Bahru